Kisenge Airport  is an airport serving the town of Kisenge in Lualaba Province, Democratic Republic of the Congo. The runway is just north of the town.

Kisenge is the site of an old manganese mine, and was a refugee center during the Second Congo War.

See also

Transport in the Democratic Republic of the Congo
List of airports in the Democratic Republic of the Congo

References

External links
 OurAirports - Kisenge
 FallingRain - Kisenge Airport
 OpenStreetMap - Kisenge Airport
 

Airports in Lualaba Province